= Keyhole (Internet forum) =

Closed Chinese forum

- Website type: Discussion forum
- Founded: April 13, 2000; 26 years ago
- Dissolved: March 30, 2021; 5 years ago
- Headquarters: Haikou
- Owner: Kaidi Club
- Website: club.kdnet.net (redirects to m.9kd.com)

Keyhole, commonly known as Maoyan Kanren, which is directly translated as Looking at Human Beings from a Cat's Eye, was a Chinese renowned current affairs and politics forum established in Haikou in April 2000, and was closed on March 30, 2021.

== History ==
Keyhole was registered in Haikou City, Hainan Province, People's Republic of China. The forum was launched in April 2000.

Keyhole was the host block of the Kaidi Club, and was once ranked as the first most visited BBS forum in China. On Mar 30, 2021, it was abruptly shut down.
